Hoseynabad-e Posht-e Rud (also Romanized as Ḩoseynābād-e Posht-e Rūd; also known as Hosein Abad and Ḩoseynābād) is a village in Posht Rud Rural District, in the Central District of Narmashir County, Kerman Province, Iran. At the 2006 census, its population was 840, in 191 families.

References 

Populated places in Narmashir County